Jammin' with Friends is the fourth studio album by rock artist, Poison lead singer and reality television star Bret Michaels. The album was released on June 25, 2013 by Poor Boy Records.
The album is Michaels' first album since 2010's Custom Built. The album charted at number #13 on the Top Hard Rock Albums, #23 on the Top Independent Albums, #29 on the Top Rock Albums and #80 on The Billboard 200.

Background
The album has undergone various name and release date changes and was long in the making, initially titled after the single "Get Your Rock On" which was released more than a year before the album's final release date, then it was changed to "Good Songs & Great Friends" but eventually titled Jammin' With Friends.

The album is also referred to as a "Bret Michaels and friends album", bringing together friends that Michaels has made throughout his career with some of the songs that have shaped his success, featuring collaborations with some of the top artists and players in music from a variety of genres and generations. The album follows on in a similar theme from Michaels 2000 release "Show Me Your Hits" featuring re-recorded alternate versions of Poison and Michaels solo tracks that includes guest musicians.

During the making of this album, Michaels reappeared in the Celebrity Apprentice All Stars series as the only previous winner competing and in May 2013, Michaels began hosting the reality TV show, Rock My RV on the U.S. cable network, Travel Channel,

Content
The album features four new original songs, two new cover songs and eight newly re-recorded songs of Poison classics/Michaels solo tracks, all of which feature guest musicians. The album also contains six previously released songs featuring guest musicians from past albums.

The lead-off single from the album, a new song "Get Your Rock On" featuring Phil Collen and Sal Costa, was released January 9, 2012 and features a music video which was mostly recorded during a New Year's Eve concert from the 'Get Your Rock On' Solo tour. The concert took place in Springfield, Illinois, at the Prairie Capital Convention Center.

In conjunction with the first single, an alternate version titled "Get Your Ride On" featuring Phil Collen was released on January 10, 2012. The song served as Monster Energy AMA Supercross Opener on Speed with an exclusive video that premiered on SPEED TV January 7, 2012. The video was
customized for each race throughout the season.

A re-recorded version of "Nothin' But a Good Time" featuring Ace Frehley and Michael Anthony was also released as a single. The song includes two new versions of the classic hit both appearing on the album.

Another new song titled "They Don't Make An App For That (The App Song)", was released as a single through Michaels' official Bret Michaels App in August 2012. The song is a fun, tongue-in-cheek country crossover tune that takes on today's social media culture. "The App Song" also features a teaser video.
In January, 2013, Michaels released the fifth single, the new song "You Know You Want It" featuring Peter Keys.
 
The album's new cover songs include "Sweet Home Alabama" originally recorded by Lynyrd Skynyrd and "Margaritaville" originally recorded by Jimmy Buffett and among the newly re-recorded Poison classics is the Billboard Hot 100 number-one single, "Every Rose Has Its Thorn" featuring the "Queen of Country Music" Loretta Lynn.

Track listing

Chart performance

References

2013 albums
Bret Michaels albums